USS LST-314 was a  in the United States Navy during World War II.

Construction and career 
LST-314 was laid down on 7 September 1942 at New York Navy Yard, Brooklyn, New York. Launched on 30 December 1942 and commissioned on 15 January 1943.

During World War II, LST-314 was assigned to the Europe-Africa-Middle theater. She took part in the Invasion of Sicily from 9 to 15 July 1943 and the Salerno landings from 9 to 21 September later that year.

She took part in the Invasion of Normandy from 6 June until her fate on the 9th. On 9 June 1944, she was struck by a torpedo in the Seine Bay while being attacked by the German motor torpedo boats S 172, S 174, S 175 and S 187 and sank with 67 officers and sailors.

LST-282 was struck from the Navy Register on 22 August 1944.

Gallery

Awards 
LST-314 have earned the following awards:

American Campaign Medal
Combat Action Ribbon
European-Africa-Middle East Campaign Medal (3 battle stars)
World War II Victory Medal

Citations

Sources 
 
 
 
 

World War II amphibious warfare vessels of the United States
Ships built in Brooklyn
1942 ships
LST-1-class tank landing ships of the United States Navy